Elsa Prawitz (1932–2001) was a Swedish film and stage actress.

Selected filmography
 Divorced (1951)
 The Road to Klockrike (1953)
 Salka Valka (1954)
 Enchanted Walk (1954)
 Men in the Dark (1955)
 Whoops! (1955)
 Night Child (1956)
 The Girl in Tails (1956)
 Mannequin in Red (1958)
 Summer and Sinners (1960)
 When Darkness Falls (1960)
 Lovely Is the Summer Night (1961)
 Hide and Seek (1963)
 Morianna (1965)
 Woman of Darkness (1966)
 The Reluctant Sadist (1967)
 The Vicious Circle (1967)

References

Bibliography
 Goble, Alan. The Complete Index to Literary Sources in Film. Walter de Gruyter, 1999.
 Steene, Birgitta. Ingmar Bergman: A Reference Guide. Amsterdam University Press, 2005.

External links

1931 births
2001 deaths
Swedish film actresses
Swedish stage actresses
People from Stockholm